Going steady refers to a form of dating. 

Going Steady may refer to:
Going Steady (book), film reviews by Pauline Kael
Going Steady (1958 film), American film
Going Steady (1979 film), Israeli comedy
Going Steady (Buzzcocks album), also known as Singles – Going Steady
Going Steady, album by Steady B